Loophole is a 1981 British heist crime film directed by John Quested and starring Albert Finney, Martin Sheen, Susannah York, Jonathan Pryce, Colin Blakely and Tony Doyle. It was written by Jonathan Hales, based upon the novel by Robert Pollock.  Music is by Lalo Schifrin.

Plot
The film opens with a safe-break that yields unexpectedly low gains for the robbers. Daniels (Finney) plots the bank robbery, having targeted this institution because he has discovered that the main subterranean vault, thought to be impregnable, lies within a short distance of a main sewer. Enlisting the services of a  boat-dealer to supply equipment, he targets Booker (Sheen) who, as an architect, has the skill needed to pinpoint the exact location underground. Booker angrily rejects the first approach from Daniels but later, harassed by his bank manager (played by Robert Morley) and having to support a new business venture by his wife (Susannah York), he agrees on the undertaking, provided that no violence is to be used.

With Gardner (Colin Blakely) keeping watch from a rented nearby office, the titular loophole of the sewer access is utilized by the robbery crew, setting off the bank alarms on entering the vault from beneath and continuing to empty the contents when the police arrive. The police decide the alarms are defective and turn them off for the evening.

As the gang are preparing to leave, a heavy downpour of rain starts to flood the sewer system and the gang are seen to struggle against a raging torrent as they are laden with spoils. Booker refuses to leave and remains in the vault hoping the water will go down before the vault is open on business hours. One of the robbers who had been injured by inhaling sewer gas earlier in the scene, Harry (Alfred Lynch), is seen floating away and is assumed to have died. The final scenes show Booker in his own studio, when Daniels visits him to offer him another job.

Cast

Reception

The staff at Variety said that the core of the plot was one of the few bright spots of the movie. Variety went on to say that the film didn't give Albert Finney and Martin Sheen a chance to show their talents, owing to the script's quality. The staff also went on to write that the film offered very little in terms of action or suspense.

Spinning Image gave the film 5 out of 10 stars with the overall summary of the review being that there wasn't enough peril, that the plot of the heist was too straightforward for most people and that the ending was rushed.

Loophole has a 25% rating on Rotten Tomatoes.

References

External links
 
 
 

1981 films
1980s crime thriller films
1980s heist films
British crime thriller films
British heist films
Films based on British novels
Films scored by Lalo Schifrin
1980s English-language films
1980s British films